Manassas Park station is a Virginia Railway Express station in Manassas Park, Virginia. The station serves the Virginia Railway Express Manassas Line, and shares the right-of-way with Amtrak's  and  trains; however, no Amtrak trains stop here.

References

External links 

Station from Manassas Drive from Google Maps Street View

Transportation in Manassas Park, Virginia
Virginia Railway Express stations
Manassas Park, Virginia
Railway stations in the United States opened in 1992
1992 establishments in Virginia